Balham Valley is an ice-free valley between the Insel Range and the Apocalypse Peaks, in Victoria Land, Antarctica. It was named by the Victoria University of Wellington Antarctic Expedition (1958–59) for R.W. Balham, biologist with the New Zealand party of the Commonwealth Trans-Antarctic Expedition who did the first freshwater biology in this area in 1957–58.

Antarctic Specially Protected Area
It is consequently important as a reference base for measuring changes in the similar polar desert ecosystems of the other Dry Valleys where scientific investigations are conducted.

References

 

Valleys of Victoria Land
McMurdo Dry Valleys
Antarctic Specially Protected Areas